The Rail Safety Inspection Office is an agency of the government of the Czech Republic. It supervises the Czech rail system and investigates rail accidents and incidents.

The agency has its headquarters in 1st district, Prague. The agency has 38 employees in five offices, including those in Prague, Brno, České Budějovice, Ostrava, and Plzeň.

History
In accordance with Act No. 77/2002, the agency was established in January 2003.

References

External links 

 The Rail Safety Inspection Office of the Czech Republic homepage
 The Rail Safety Inspection Office of the Czech Republic homepage 

Rail accident investigators
Rail transport in the Czech Republic
2003 establishments in the Czech Republic
Government agencies of the Czech Republic
Transport organizations based in the Czech Republic